Jimmy Lange (born August 25, 1975) is an American professional boxer.

Early life
He began boxing at the age of five in Arlington, Virginia when his father who became his manager first brought him to Olympia Boxing Gym in Falls Church. Boxing immediately ignited interest in Jimmy when he realized the level of discipline, respect, and skill that was needed to be a great boxer.

The Contender
Lange was a contestant on the first season of the NBC reality TV show, The Contender, produced and hosted by Sylvester Stallone and Sugar Ray Leonard. Stallone’s brother attended one of Jimmy’s boxing matches in Washington DC and was so impressed, he recommended him for the show as one of the 16 boxers.  Current special adviser, "First Lady of Boxing"  Jackie Kallen served as 'den mother' on the show.

On the show, Jimmy was placed on the East Coast team and fought Joey Gilbert in the final First Round fight, a fight Lange lost. Lange was originally scheduled to fight Anthony Bonsante however, an argument ensued over Bonsante choosing not to do so—possibly seeing Lange as a greater threat.

Lange was voted back to fight in the top "fan favorite" fight at the show's finale where he beat contestant Tarick Salmaci in a majority decision.

Professional career

Lange is currently trained by highly regarded Don Turner who has worked previously with former world champions Evander Holyfield and Larry Holmes, among others. He became the WBE Junior Middleweight title holder after defeating local opponent Perry Ballard in a 4th round TKO in his hometown of Fairfax, VA on September 17, 2005.

Lange fought a rematch with Joey Gilbert on February 18, 2006 at the Patriot Center in Fairfax, VA for the vacant NABO middleweight title. He lost the fight by TKO in the third round.

Lange returned to the Patriot Center on October 7, 2006, to fightTommy Wilt. The former Contender star managed a TKO victory with 15 seconds remaining in the 10th and final round. Lange made his fourth consecutive appearance at the Patriot Center on December 9, 2006, fighting Fontaine Cabell for the WBC Continental Americas Jr. Middleweight title. The 12 round fight ended in a draw.

In early 2007, International Hall of Fame trainer, Angelo Dundee, who has worked with top notch boxers such as Muhammad Ali, Sugar Ray Leonard and George Foreman, returned to Northern Virginia to be Chief Second for Jimmy. Lange and Fontaine were scheduled for a rematch on May 12, 2007.

On May 12, 2007, Lange won the hard fought battle with Fontaine Cabell and won the match with an eighth-round TKO and earned the WBC Continental Americas Super Welterweight title. A shoulder injury requiring surgery forced Lange to voluntarily relinquish the belt which is now held by Julio Cesar Chavez, Jr.

On November 1, 2008 at the Patriot Center in Fairfax, Virginia, in his first fight since the surgery, Jimmy appeared back in top form by winning a unanimous decision over Grover Wiley.  In May 2009, he followed that fight up winning the WBC's USNBC belt via fifth-round TKO of Frank Houghtaling.

Lange looked sharp in dismantling his former Contender teammate Jonathan Reid with a ninth round TKO to retain his WBC belt on September 26, 2009 at the Patriot Center. Six months later he returned to the Fairfax venue and lost his belt in a 12-round decision to Chase Shields on March 6, 2010.  After the tough defeat, Lange got back on the winning streak with a pair of convincing victories over Jimmy LeBlanc (July 10, 2010, Patriot Center) and Mike McFail (August 20, 2010, Greensboro, NC).

He kept the unbeaten streak going scoring a dramatic 10th round knockout of Joe Wyatt to capture the North American Boxing Association's U.S. 154-pound title on November 6, 2010 at the Patriot Center. Lange returned to the Patriot Center on March 12, 2011 and defeated Jimmy "The Fighting School Teacher" Holmes for his fourth straight win.  He earned his 36th win with a unanimous decision over Mike McFail on June 25, 2011 in Virginia Beach.

Headlining his 13th show in front of his hometown fans at the familiar confines of the Patriot Center on September 10, 2011, Jimmy beat Raul Munoz by 6th-round TKO to capture the World Boxing Union (WBU) championship. He successfully defended his WBU title and added the North American Boxing Union (NABU) with a 12-round unanimous shutout decision against Ruben Galvan on February 11, 2012 - his seventh consecutive win and 14th headlining event at the Patriot Center.

Professional boxing record

References

External links
BoxingInsider.com profile interview with Jimmy Lange
Profile from NBC
 

1975 births
Boxers from Virginia
The Contender (TV series) participants
Living people
American male boxers
People from Great Falls, Virginia
Light-middleweight boxers